Tiquadra is a genus of moths belonging to the family Tineidae.

Some species are:
Tiquadra aeneonivella  Walker, 1864 (from Venezuela)
Tiquadra albescens  (Diakonoff, 1968) (from Philippines)
Tiquadra atomarcha  Meyrick, 1917 (from Australia)
Tiquadra butyranthes  Meyrick, 1931 (from Brazil)
Tiquadra circumdata  (Zeller, 1877) (from Colombia)
Tiquadra cultrifera 	Meyrick, 1914 (from Ghana to Congo)
Tiquadra crocidura  Meyrick, 1922 (from Brazil)
Tiquadra drapetica  Meyrick, 1919 (from Brazil)
Tiquadra enstacta  Meyrick, 1928 (from Andaman)
Tiquadra etiennei Viette, 1988 (from La Réunion)
Tiquadra exercitata  Meyrick, 1922 (from Brazil)
Tiquadra galactura  Meyrick, 1931 (from Brazil)
Tiquadra ghesquierei 	Gozmány, 1967 (from Congo)
Tiquadra goochii 	Walsingham, 1881 (South Africa, Congo, Comoros)
Tiquadra guillermeti Viette, 1988 (from La Réunion)
Tiquadra gypsatma 	(Meyrick, 1911) (from Seychelles)
Tiquadra halithea  (Meyrick, 1927) (from Vanuatu)
Tiquadra inophora  (Meyrick, 1919) (from New Guinea)
Tiquadra inscitella  Walker, 1863 (from Mexico)
Tiquadra maculata  (Meyrick, 1886) (from Tonga)
Tiquadra mallodeta  Meyrick, 1924 (from Mexico)
Tiquadra nubilella  Amsel, 1956 (from Venezuela)
Tiquadra nucifraga  Meyrick, 1919 (from Colombia)
Tiquadra lentiginosa  (Zeller, 1877) (from West Indies)
Tiquadra lichenea Walsingham, 1897 (from Central African Rep. to South Africa)
Tiquadra nivosa  (Felder, 1875) (from Brazil)
Tiquadra ochreata Gozmány, 1967 (from Congo)
Tiquadra pircuniae  (Zeller, 1877) (from Argentina)
Tiquadra pontifica  Meyrick, 1919 (from French Guiana)
Tiquadra semiglobata  Meyrick, 1922 from Peru
Tiquadra seraphinei Guillermet, 2009
Tiquadra syntripta  Meyrick, 1922 (from Brazil)
Tiquadra reversella  Walker, 1866 (from Brazil)
Tiquadra vilis  Meyrick, 1922 (from Argentina/Brazil)

References

Hapsiferinae
Tineidae genera